Were and wer are archaic terms for adult male humans and were often used for alliteration with wife as "were and wife" in Germanic-speaking cultures.

In Anglo-Saxon law wer was the value of a man's life. He could be required to pay his wer to the king as a penalty for crime. If he was murdered then his relatives were entitled to his wergild as compensation from the murderer.

Etymology and usage

While this prefix may not be derived from the above word, in folklore and fantasy fiction, were- is often used as a prefix applied to an animal name to indicate a type of therianthropic figure or shapeshifter (e.g. "were-boar"). Hyphenation used to be mandatory, but is now commonly dropped, as in werecat and wererat. This usage can be seen as analogical reformation from werewolf (literally, "man-wolf"), as there is no equivalent wifwylf or wyfwylf yet attested.

See also
 List of common false etymologies of English words#Other for a longer discussion of wer, wyf, and mann
 Man (word)

 For shapeshifters:
 Cynanthropy
 Lycanthropy (disambiguation)
 Mannaz
 Skin-walker
 Therianthropy
 Werecat
 Werehyena
 Were-jaguar
 Wererat
 Werewolf

References

Etymologies
English words